50 Boötis is a single star located 275 light years away from the Sun in the northern constellation of Boötes. It is visible to the naked eye as a dim, blue-white hued star with an apparent visual magnitude of 5.38. The object is moving closer to the Earth with a heliocentric radial velocity of −9 km/s.

This is a B-type main-sequence star with a stellar classification of B9 Vn, where the 'n' notation indicates "nebulous" lines due to rapid rotation. It is 174 million years old with a projected rotational velocity of 232 km/s. The star has 3.31 times the mass of the Sun and about 3.1 times the Sun's radius. It is radiating 55 times the Sun's luminosity from its photosphere at an effective temperature of 12,140 K.

References

B-type main-sequence stars
Boötes
Durchmusterung objects
Bootis, 50
136849
075178
5718